Karabey can refer to:

 Karabey, Çat
 Karabey, Karayazı
 Karabey, Yavuzeli